Jiří Sovák (né Schmitzer; 27 December 1920 – 6 September 2000) was a Czech actor, best known for his comedy roles.

Life and theatre career
Jiří Sovák was born Jiří Schmitzer to the family of an innkeeper in Prague. He later changed his name to Sovák as a protest against Nazi Germany and its occupation of Czechoslovakia. In 1941 – during the WW2 – he graduated from Prague State Conservatory where he had been studying drama. His father did not want him to be an actor, so he worked as a clerk and played in an amateur theatre group; today known as Rokoko Theatre. In 1943 he got his first professional engagement with Horácké Theatre in Třebíč. During military service he met Miroslav Horníček (who became famous actor too) and made friends for life.

In 1947 he went to Prague where he played in the E.F. Burian Theatre (1947–1952), Vinohrady Theatre (1952–1966) and National Theatre (1966–1983). He retired on 31 March 1983. In 2000 he fell down on his terrace, broke his hip and got an embolism during his operation. He died in a Prague hospital before he was 80. He is buried in small town Stříbrná Skalice, in a private grave closed to the public.

Film and TV career
Jiří Sovák first appeared in a movie in 1942 and then played a lot of minor roles. He played his first main character in Dařbuján a Pandrhola (dir. Martin Frič, 1959) and created a lot of expressive roles in the 1960s, '70s and '80s. Among his best-known roles are Antonín Skopec in Světáci (Dandies; dir. Zdeněk Podskalský) and Jiří Kroupa in Marečku, podejte mi pero! (Mark, Fetch Me a Pen!; dir. Oldřich Lipský, 1976). He also played in crazy comedies such as Pane, vy jste vdova (You Are a Widow, Sir!; dir. Václav Vorlíček, 1970) or Což takhle dát si špenát (What About Having Some Spinach; dir. Václav Vorlíček, 1977), sci-fi comedies such as Zabil jsem Einsteina, pánové (I Killed Einstein, Sirs; dir. Oldřich Lipský, 1970) or Zítra vstanu a opařím se čajem (Tomorrow I'll Wake Up and Scald Myself with Tea ; dir. Jindřich Polák, 1977), and movies for children, e.g. Ať žijí duchové (Long Live Ghosts; dir. Oldřich Lipský, 1977). In 1990s he played old men such as the cabinet maker Růžička in Kolya. Sovák's last movie role was in Návrat ztraceného ráje (Lost Paradise Recovered; dir. Vojtěch Jasný, 1999).

Sovák entered Czechoslovak television as soon as it came into existence in 1953. He played in a lot of TV films and serials and made unforgettable roles in microcomedies such as Uspořená libra (A Pound on Demand, based on a play by Seán O'Casey; Vladimír Svitáček, 1963), and Bohouš (1968); and children's TV serials such as Pan Tau, Arabela, and Létající Čestmír. His best roles were in the serials Byli jednou dva písaři (with Horníček; based on Bouvard et Pécuchet by Gustave Flaubert; dir. Ján Roháč, 1972) and Chalupáři (Cottagers; 1975).

Private life
He married three times. His son from his first marriage Jiří Schmitzer (born in 1949) became an actor and folk singer. He had a cold relationship with his son (with whom he had appeared in movies for many times) after he left his wife and even colder when Schmitzer caused a fatal car accident in 1976.

References

External links
 

1920 births
2000 deaths
Male actors from Prague
Czech male stage actors
Czech male film actors
Czech male television actors
Czechoslovak male actors
20th-century Czech male actors
Recipients of the Thalia Award